Paula Zima (born 1953) is an American artist known for her sculptures, paintings, and etchings. She was born in Pasadena, California, and lived in Washington and the California Bay Area and Central Coast before settling in New Mexico near Santa Fe where she currently lives.

Artwork

Paula Zima's life-size bronze sculpture group, "Tequski' wa Suwa", was installed September 1988 in front of the Mission San Luis Obispo de Tolosa in San Luis Obispo, California. The artist commented at the time that "My intention in creating the piece is to honor the two major life forms of the region, before the influx of the European culture, the indigenous Chumash people and the Grizzly Bear." "Tequski' wa suwa" is a Chumash phrase, in the dialect of the people who lived where the mission now is, and translates to "bear and child". Funds for the sculpture were provided by the Stanley P. Von Stein memorial trust, and the Mary Jane Duval memorial trust .  The work was surveyed by the Save Outdoor Sculpture! initiative in 1994 and was deemed to be "Well maintained."

Other public works include two "Greeting Bears" which are two life-sized concrete castings of a grizzly bear, placed at each of the two bridges that lead to the town of Los Osos, California. The castings were later painted by the artist.  Her sculpture Otter Touching Its Tail, located in Santa Cruz, California is work in which "an abstract otter forms a doughnut by touching its tail and hind feet with its head and front feet. There is triangular embossing along the otter's sides that may represent a wave motif."  Zima's Meditation Bird is located at Sierra Vista Hospital in San Luis Obispo, California.

Zima has illustrated many holiday gift boxes for See's Candies.

Zima's sculpture has been influenced mainly by artists Beni Bufano, Marino Marini, Gustav Vigeland and Allan Houser, with whom she apprenticed.

Education
Zima studied natural sciences, drawing and sculpture at Stephens College in Columbia, Missouri in the early 1970s before attending Los Llanos School of Arts & Crafts, sculpture and painting, in Santa Fe, New Mexico and then California Polytechnic State University in San Luis Obispo where she obtained a BA degree in Graphic Communication, Commercial Illustration in 1979. She has also studied printmaking, painting and drawing at Cuesta College in San Luis Obispo, California.

References

American etchers
1953 births
Living people
American women painters
American women printmakers
American women sculptors
American contemporary painters
California Polytechnic State University alumni
Cuesta College alumni
Stephens College alumni
Artists from Pasadena, California
Painters from California
Painters from New Mexico
Sculptors from California
20th-century American printmakers
21st-century American printmakers
20th-century American painters
21st-century American painters
21st-century American sculptors
20th-century American sculptors
20th-century American women artists
21st-century American women artists
Sculptors from New Mexico
Women etchers
Women sculptors